
Ramel may refer to:

People

Given name

Ramel Bradley, American professional basketball player who currently plays for Hapoel Holon of the Israeli Basketball Premier League
Ramel Curry, American former professional basketball player

Surname

Brooke Ramel, American singer-songwriter 
Dominique-Vincent Ramel-Nogaret, French lawyer and politician
Françoise Roch-Ramel, Swiss pharmacologist
Fredrik Ramel, Swedish baron, governor, diplomat and officer
Hans Ramel, Swedish landlord, hovjägmästare (Master of the Horse) and member of parliament
Jean-Pierre Ramel (the younger), French general 
Lotta Ramel, Swedish actress
Juliette Ramel, Swedish Olympic dressage rider
Kathryn Ramel, cricketer
Povel Ramel, Swedish entertainer
Regis de Ramel, aviation business owner and philanthropist

Other

Ahl Ramel, small town and rural commune in Taroudant Province of the Souss-Massa-Drâa region of Morocco
Sania Ramel Airport, airport serving Tétouan
SS Commissaire Ramel, a French cargo-passenger ship
the Eastern Pomerania town Rahmel; see Rumia